Chestnut Ridge is an unincorporated community in Fayette County, Pennsylvania, United States. Chestnut Ridge has a post office, with ZIP code 15422, which opened on August 22, 1912.

References

Unincorporated communities in Fayette County, Pennsylvania
Unincorporated communities in Pennsylvania